Arthur Sarkissian is an Armenian artist and painter.

Life 
Sarkissian attended the School of Fine Arts there in 1977, followed by the Yerevan State Pedagogical University (Drawing) in 1989. He lives and works in Yerevan, Armenia.

Art 
Sarkissian works in abstract art as a statement of post-Soviet freedom of expression. He said in 2005, "my approach to painting developed from the desire to free myself from Socialist Realism."

His canvases combine painting and silkscreen printing, incorporating text, photographs, signs, architectural images and extracts from other paintings, fusing oil paint with found ephemera.

Such a polyglot, polysemic art is not unique to Sarkissian. We see his style anticipated by Robert Rauschenberg, and before him Kurt Schwitters. We even see its textures and practices, as well as philosophical positions, reflected in the work of such disparate predecessors as Warhol, Cornell, Miro, Malevich, and, of course, Picasso. Among other things, Sarkissian demonstrates that the “collage aesthetic” – the simultaneously disjunctive and conjunctive qualities that uniquely define modern composition – remains one of 20th century art’s most significant and enduring legacies. Indeed, this collage aesthetic provides the perceptual crucible in which the dialectic described above is forged, and it defines the particular visual world in which Sarkissian finds his expression.

His installation artwork includes the work Closed Session, comprising a row of seven chairs of varying sizes, each standing on four lit lightbulbs; described by Sonia Balassanian, curator of the Armenian Center for Contemporary Experimental Art (ACCEA), as a "satirical reference to self-aggrandizing decision-makers."

His work is displayed in the Museum of Modern Art in Yerevan.

Works
Sarkissian's works include:

 Mind Games (2003), oil on canvas, 400 x 400 cm
 Game in the Museum (2005), mixed media on canvas, 195 x 145 inches
 Evening in the museum (2005), mixed media on canvas, 95 x 175 cm
 20 Pages (2006), oil on canvas, 138 x 118 cm
 Three colour stains (2006), mixed media on canvas, 100 x 80 cm
 Closed Session (2007), mixed media installation
 Nervus Probandi (2009), oil on canvas, 120 x 195 cm
 Image Stripes (2011), oil on canvas, 110 x 140 cm,      It was sold at the Christie's Auction in London,

Exhibitions 
Solo exhibitions:
1994 – Bossen Cultural Center, Saarbrücken, Germany
1998 – JNR Gallery, Yerevan, Armenia
2003 – Mind Games, First Floor Gallery, Yerevan, Armenia

2006 – First Floor Gallery, Yerevan, Armenia
2008 – Museum of Modern Art, Yerevan, Armenia
2009 – Between The Images, One Gallery, Yerevan, Armenia
2010 – Between The Images 2, 1927 Gallery, Fine Arts Building, Los Angeles, California
2010 – Between The Images 3, Artology Gallery 101, Los Angeles, California
2013 – "Artist Retrospective 2011–2013 and Catalogue Presentation" Dalan Art Gallery, Yerevan, Armenia

Group exhibitions:
1989 – "Art of the USSR: The Past 50 Years", Madrid, Spain Catalogues
1991 – "New Tendencies in Art", Goyak Gallery, Yerevan, Armenia
1991 – "Contemporary Art From Armenia", The New Academy Gallery, London, UK
1992 – "Contemporary Armenian Artists", Gallery Vision, Kassel, Germany
1992 – "Armenian Post-Modernism", Moscow, Russia
1997 – "Dreams & Visions", Art Benefit, Chicago, Illinois, US
1999 – "Windows to Armenia" and "With Many Voices", Fourth Presbyterian Church, Chicago, Illinois, US
2005 – "Armenian Contemporary Art", Harvest Gallery, Glendale, California, US
2005 – Marie Pargas Art Gallery, Asheville, NC, US
2005 – The Collection Of Viken Makhyan, AGBU Pasadena Center, US
2005 – "Photo Plus", ACCEA, Yerevan, Armenia
2006 – "Art Without Borders", Havana Gallery, Oldenburg, Germany
2007 – "Armenian Landscapes in Contemporary Art", EWZ, Zurich, Switzerland
2007 – "5 Armenian Artists", Marcel, France
2007 – "Armenian Contemporary Art", Paris, France
2008 – "Undercurrent Shifts", ACCEA, curated by Sonia Balassanian and David Kareyan
2009 – "Transitional Hypothesis", group exhibition of Armenian-Japanese artists, ACCEA
2010 – "Colors of Armenia Exhibition" Yerevan, Armenia
2010 – "Colors of Armenia Exhibition" Marseille, France
2010 – "OPTIMIZM, Armenian New Art" Artists Union, Yerevan, Armenia 
2011 – "Art Cube Gallery" Group Exhibition Laguna Beach, California, US
2011 – "Dalan Art Gallery" Group Exhibition Yerevan, Armenia
2013 – "Dalan Art Gallery" Group Exhibition New Local Art, Yerevan, Armenia
2013 – "Saatchi Gallery" Burning Bright at Hyatt Regency London –  London, UK

Gallery

References

External links 

 
 on Artnet
 on Artsy

 Art Cube Gallery

Year of birth missing (living people)
Living people
Armenian State Pedagogical University alumni
Armenian painters
Contemporary painters
Postmodern artists
Abstract expressionist artists
Abstract artists